Ghorbati (self-designations also Mugat and Hadurgar) is an ethnic group, an originally nomadic community in Iran and Afghanistan, as well as Central Asia where they are part of the various communities termed Lyuli. They are widespread in Iran, from where they have migrated to other regions over the centuries. Many are Shia, with a significant Sunni minority. They either trace their ancestry to Sassanid Persia, or to Arabs, including Syeds. In 1976–77, the Ghorbati in Afghanistan numbered 1,000 families (ca. 5,000 people). Some settled in Peshawar, Pakistan. Some subgroups are connected to the Basseri and Qashqai tribes. 

Their traditional occupations include carpentry, smithery, peddling, manufacturing and sale of small goods of domestic use, prayer-writing and livestock dealing. Older women also practiced fortune telling and healing. Because of female participation in the workforce, which goes against the established gender norms of the region, they are looked down upon by non-Ghorbat. 

The sieve-makers are known as Ghalbelbaf and Chighalbaf in Afghanistan, Kalbilbof in Tajikistan and Ghirbalband in Iran. Some also had government jobs or performed in religious roles. Overall, their position in Afghan society was quite low but they were Afghan citizens, held ID cards and were conscripted, unlike the related Mugat “Jogi” community.

Their mother tongue is Persian but they also have a jargon that they consider to be their own called Ghorbati (see article Persian-Romani), which is a secret language with a heavy Persian base, also known as Mogadi (in Shiraz), Magadi (in Herat) and Qazulagi (in Kabul). This vocabulary contains many Semitic words, with a few Domari and other terms. 

Historically, they were part of the Banu Sassan, a medieval Islamic guild of beggars, rogues, criminals, charlatans, entertainers, tricksters, astrologers, Sufis and preachers, which comprised the group with the highest status. They were of heterogeneous ethnic origin. The name Ghorbat seems to have originated from the Banu Sassan, when they renamed themselves  Bani Al Ghuraba’ (the tribe of Exile). The modern Ghorbati vocabulary can be traced back to them. 

However, they have mainly been confused with the Dom people because the latter are known as Qurbat or Kurbat (Arabic: قرباط/كربات), which is an entirely different name, although it appears similar to Ghorbat (Persian: غربت). However, this is cognate with the Romani name Gurbeti, although there is no proof of any historical connection between these groups, and the Ghorbati are believed to be nomads to who travelled eastwards, rather than being of Indian origin like the Koli, Roma and Dom. 

They are distinct from the Koli, although in some regions the terms “koli” and “ghorbati” overlap as they are used as general epithets for all “Gypsy-like” communities regardless of the community’s own designation, and can be very pejorative. The slur “ghorbati” has even been used for people displaced during the Iran-Iraq war. It can thus become difficult to identify the “true” Ghorbati and the “true” Koli.  

Ghorbats from Iran have also migrated to Maharashtra and other parts of India in the 1970s, although some subgroups were already present in Mughal India since the 16th century. The name is also spelled Ghorbat, Gurbat, Ghurbati, Qorbat. They are a severely marginalised minority in Iran, suffering from a range of social problems. Many do not hold ID cards. Some Iranians consider the Ghorbati Il-e Fiuj community  to be “Pakistani mafia”.

See also
Persian-Romani - mislabelled language of the Ghorbati
Lyuli
Peripatetic groups of Afghanistan
Kowliye - perhaps related to the Ghorbat, although this is not known for sure as the groups in Iraq might be ethnic Dom.

References

Ethnic groups in Iran
Ethnic groups in Afghanistan
Modern nomads
Dom people